Dusit Thani was a miniature city and micronation project created by King Vajiravudh of Siam.

Dusit Thani may also refer to:

 Dusit Thani hotel or Dusit Thani Bangkok, a hotel in Bangkok
 Dusit Thani Public Company Limited, also known as Dusit International, a hospitality company based in Thailand
 Dusit Thani College, a private college in Bangkok, also owned by the company